Zuzanna Ginczanka, pen name of Zuzanna Polina Gincburg (March 22, 1917 – January 1945) was a Polish-Jewish poet of the interwar period. Although she published only a single collection of poetry in her lifetime, the book O centaurach (On Centaurs, 1936) created a sensation in Poland's literary circles. She was arrested and executed in Kraków shortly before the end of World War II.

Life
Zuzanna Ginczanka was born Zuzanna Polina Ginzburg ("Gincburg" in Polish phonetic respelling) in Kiev, then part of the Russian Empire. Her Jewish parents fled the Russian Civil War, settling in 1922 in the predominantly Yiddish-speaking town of Równe, also called Równe Wołyńskie by the inhabitants, in the Kresy Wschodnie (Eastern Borderlands) of pre-War Poland (now in Western part of Ukraine). Her father, Simon Ginzburg, was a lawyer by profession, with her mother Tsetsiliya (Цецилия) Ginzburg, née Sandberg, a housewife. Ginczanka was holder of a Nansen passport  and despite efforts made to this end, she was unsuccessful in obtaining Polish citizenship before the outbreak of the war. Abandoned by her father, who after a divorce left for Berlin, and later by her mother, who after remarriage left for Spain, she lived in the Równe home of her maternal grandmother, Klara Sandberg, by all accounts a wise and prudent woman who was responsible for her upbringing. The moderately affluent house of Klara Sandberg in the town's main street, with its ground-floor shop, was described by the writer Jerzy Andrzejewski, Ginczanka's contemporary who sought her acquaintance, and independently by the poet Jan Śpiewak, the town's fellow resident. She was called "Sana" by her closest friends. Between 1927 and 1935 she attended a state high school at Równe, the Państwowe Gimnazjum im. T. Kościuszki. In 1935 she moved to Warsaw to begin studies at Warsaw University. Her studies there soon ended, likely due to antisemitic incidents at the university.

Early period
Ginczanka spoke both Russian, the choice of her emancipated parents, and the Polish of her friends, but did not know a word of Yiddish. Her longing to become a Polish poet caused her to choose the Polish language. According to Ginczanka's mother, she began composing verses at the age of 4, authoring a whole ballad at the age of 8. She published her first poems while still at school, debuting in 1931  at the age of 14  with the poem "Uczta wakacyjna" (A Vacation Feast) published in the bimonthly high-school newspaper Echa Szkolne edited by Czesław Janczarski. During this period of her life Ginczanka was also active as the author of song lyrics. Her "mainstream" debut in a nationwide forum took place in August 1933 in the pages of the Kuryer Literacko-Naukowy, a Sunday supplement to the well-known Ilustrowany Kuryer Codzienny, with the publication of the 16-line poem entitled "Żyzność sierpniowa" (Fertility in the Month of August; or perhaps, with greater poetic licence: Fullness of August). In the "Żyzność sierpniowa", the 16-year-old poet speaks with the voice of a mature woman looking wistfully back on the world of young people in the bloom of life, with its ripeness for love (hence the title), from the knowing and indulgent perspective of one whose life had come to fruition long before: the reader can be forgiven for thinking that the author of the verses before him is a person of advanced age. The last two lines, moreover, give voice to the catastrophic sonorities that will forever remain the signature trait of Ginczanka's poetry, often couched in sanguinary imagery as they are here:

Encouraged by Julian Tuwim to participate in the Young Poets' Competition (Turniej Młodych Poetów) organized the next spring by the Wiadomości Literackie, the most important literary periodical in Poland at the time, she won an honourable mention (third class) with the poem "Gramatyka" (The Grammar), printed in the issue of 15 July 1934 of the weekly that was devoted in part to the results of the competition. She was 17 years old; most if not all of the other 22 finalists (like Tadeusz Hollender, b. 1910, and Anna Świrszczyńska, b. 1909, who won first prizes, or Witold Makowiecki, b. 1903, who won an honourable mention, first class, and Juliusz Żuławski, b. 1910, honourable mention, third class) were her seniors in age. Seven weeks later, in its edition of 2 September 1934, Wiadomości Literackie will revisit its poetry competition by publishing a list of additional book prizes awarded to the winners: for her contribution, Zuzanna Ginczanka will receive a collection of Michelangelo's poetry in the translation of Leopold Staff. Ginczanka's poem, which opens boldly with a punctuation mark (a left parenthesis), deals with parts of speech, describing each in a poetic way beginning with the adjective, then taking on the adverb, and ending with a philosophico-philological analysis of the personal pronoun ("I without you, you without me, amounts to nought"; line 30) 

To this period belongs likewise Ginczanka's poem "Zdrada" (Betrayal; though the word can also mean "treason") composed sometime in 1934.

Warsaw period
Upon her arrival in Warsaw in September 1935, the 18-year-old Ginczanka, already notable, quickly became a "legendary figure" of the pre-War bohemian world of artists of Warsaw as a protégée of Julian Tuwim, the doyen of the Polish poets at the time, a connection which opened for her the doors to all the most important literary periodicals, salons, and publishing houses of the country. (Her detractors bestowed on her the sobriquet of "Tuwim in a petticoat", Tuwim w spódnicy; while Gombrowicz, known for inventing his own private names for all his acquaintances, monikered her "Gina".)  High-calibre critics, such as Karol Wiktor Zawodziński, have traced aspects of Ginczanka's lyricism to the poetic achievement of Tuwim, deemed both indefinable and inimitable but concerning primarily the renewed focus on the word, its freshness, and the ultimate conciseness of expression respective of each particular poetic image or vision treated. Jarosław Iwaszkiewicz for his part recalls that Ginczanka was "very good" as a poet from the first, without any initial period of incubation of the poetic talent, and  conscious of her literary prowess  kept herself apart from literary groupings, in particular wishing to distance herself publicly from the Skamander circle with which she would have normally been associated by others.  Thus for example, her frequenting of the Mała Ziemiańska café, the renowned haunt of the Warsaw literati where with gracious ease she held court at the table of Witold Gombrowicz, was memorialized in her poem "Pochwała snobów" (In Praise of Snobs) published in the satirical magazine Szpilki in 1937.  (The co-founder of the magazine in question, the artist Eryk Lipiński, who will play an important role in salvaging her manuscripts after the War, will name his daughter Zuzanna in memory of Ginczanka.  The other co-founder, Zbigniew Mitzner, will opine in his memoirs that Ginczanka was tied to this particular weekly magazine by the closest bonds of all the alliances that she maintained with the literary press.)  In testimony to her fame, she would sometimes be herself the subject of satirical poems and drawings published in literary periodicals, as for example in the 1937 Christmas issue of the Wiadomości Literackie where she is pictured in the collective cartoon representing the crème de la crème of Polish literature (next to Andrzej Nowicki and Janusz Minkiewicz, both holding Cupid's bows, though their arrows point discreetly away from her rather than towards).

Impressions
Ginczanka was a woman possessed of striking, arresting beauty  "the beauty of a Byzantine icon", in the words of the slightly older writer Ryszard Matuszewski who remembered her visits to the Zodiak café in Warsaw  many of her fellow writers remarking on her eyes in particular (each slightly different, both in some reports enhanced by a strabismus of Venus) and on the irresistibly attractive harmony between her nimble physical appearance and her personal psychology.  Jan Kott saw in fact a connection between her poetry, "which enthuses all", and her personal beauty: "there was something of a Persian qasida in both", he wrote. (Her Italian translator, Alessandro Amenta, has recently taken this line of reasoning further, opining that for her admirers, her body has merged with her text.)  For Kazimierz Brandys, her peer in age, she was a "sacred apparition" with "the eyes of a fawn".  The author Adolf Rudnicki, casting for an apt expression to describe her, settled on "Rose of Sharon" (Róża z Saronu), a trope from the Song of Songs, adding that the painter (identified by him only as "C.") for whom she sat in the nude (in the presence of her husband) confessed to him "to have never set his eyes on anything quite so beautiful in his life".  Her portrait by the noted Polish painter Aleksander Rafałowski (18941980)  a depiction en grande tenue  is well known, and has been reproduced in the Wiadomości Literackie weekly in 1937.  Ginczanka was admired by many for many reasons.  Czesław Miłosz says that the writer Zbigniew Mitzner, co-founder of the magazine Szpilki, was romantically involved with her.  She was known to repulse her suitors en masse, however, sometimes thereby  as in the case of Leon Pasternak  earning their enmity which resulted in their publishing pasquinades at her expense in revenge.  For Stanisław Piętak, one of the most distinguished Polish poets of the Interbellum period, to meet her in the street was an experience akin to encountering a star break away from the heavens above and land straight on the pavement next to you.  (There is evidence that while outwardly she received all the adulation with gracious warmth, the attention she generated weighed heavy on her mind; she reportedly confided in a female friend (Maria Zenowicz), "I feel like a Negro", sc. a curio.)  Only the poet Andrzej Nowicki was seen to enjoy her favour for a time, but even he was deemed by Tadeusz Wittlin to be a companion of convenience without relational entanglement.  Ginczanka was seen as abstemious, of studiedly modest demeanour, and virtuous  she didn't smoke or drink ("except for a few drops now and then under the duress of social propriety"): Wittlin calls her "Virtuous Zuzanna (Cnotliwa Zuzanna) in the literal [i.e., ecclesiastical] sense".  This perception was shared by others; the poet Alicja Iwańska, whose literary journey largely coincided with Ginczanka's, remembers that despite the exquisite poetry she kept publishing in the best literary journals of the country and a personal beauty that had a dazzling effect on the onlookers, Ginczanka was often diffident, given to blushing, and stammered when put on the spot.

Józef Łobodowski, perhaps the most serious contender for her hand between 1933 and 1938, dedicated to her several poems published in Wiadomości Literackie and later in the Polish émigré press, as well as devoting to her one of his last collections of poetry, Pamięci Sulamity ("In Remembrance of the Shulamite Woman"; see Bibliography), with a valuable autobiographical introduction.  While the poet Jan Śpiewak, of all the Polish littérateurs, could claim an acquaintance with Ginczanka extending over the longest period of time (having been a resident of Równe contemporaneously with her, as well as having shared her Jewish background and her status as a Volhynian settler hailing from the lands of the former Russian Empire), it is the subsequent recollections of Łobodowski that will strike the most intimate note among all the reminiscences published after the War by those who knew Ginczanka personally, betraying an undying love and affection on his part carried over an entire lifetime.

With the kind of celebrity she enjoyed, her apartment in the ulica Szpitalna in Warsaw (picture at right) was transformed into the premier literary salon of Poland on the occasions of her birthdays, name-days, etc.  Eryk Lipiński reports that it is here that he saw the famed author Witold Gombrowicz in the flesh for the first time.

Publication
Although she published only a single collection of poetry in her lifetime, the book O centaurach ("About the Centaurs"), it created a sensation.  She explained the title by pointing to the dual nature of the centaur, a mythological creature that was part man, part horse  here adopted as a simile for her poetical project of uniting in verse the disparate qualities of sagacity and sensuality, "tightly conjoined at the waist like a centaur".  This is especially significant to the feminist literary theory as it presents a vision of what has traditionally been considered male and female elements fused together in art and life.  To those who had not heard of Ginczanka before, the first exposure to her verses was often an awakening.  The testimony of the poet Tadeusz Bocheński may be cited as a case in point, being the more valuable for having been expressed in a private letter and not intended for public consumption.  Writing in February 1936 to the editor-in-chief of the literary monthly Kamena, Kazimierz Andrzej Jaworski, Bocheński excoriates the well-known poets Tuwim and Pawlikowska while at the same time stating the following:
Jastrun inspires interest, [as does] Ginczanka, otherwise unknown to me: I feel instinctively that we are dealing here with a deeper nature, with poetry of a higher pedigree (rasowsza poezja); who is she? where is this lady coming from?

One of the most distinguished modern Ukrainian poets and the one most hated by the Soviets, Yevhen Malanyuk (18971968), then living in exile in Warsaw, on being first introduced to Ginczanka's poetry by Julian Tuwim ran breathlessly into the editorial offices of the Biuletyn Polsko-Ukraiński with the news of the revelation from a new "excellent poetess".  Ginczanka did not hesitate to lend her art to the furtherance of a social cause, as shown in her poem "Słowa na wiatr" (Words To the Four Winds), published in the Wiadomości Literackie in March 1937, whose message impugns the honesty of the country's authorities and industrial groupings in making promises to render assistance to those in need during the difficult winter period.  Her voice here is mercilessly biting and derisive ("they count, and count, and lick their fingers, and count some more"  sc. the remaining winter pages in the tear-off calendar on the wall, and the money to be saved) as she accuses the potentates of stalling for time in the hope that the cold spell will pass and they will not have to make good on their pledges.

Radio dramas
Ginczanka wrote several radio dramas for the Polish national broadcaster, the Polskie Radjo.  In July 1937 her programme Pod dachami Warszawy ("Under the Roofs of Warsaw"), authored jointly with Andrzej Nowicki, was broadcast. In March 1938 Polish press carried an announcement of another radio drama authored by Ginczanka jointly with Nowicki, Sensacje amerykańskie ("American Sensations"), on the theme of Sherlock Holmes's journey to America, broadcast by the Polskie Radjo.

Intimations of war
As observed by attentive readers such as Monika Warneńska, Ginczanka had prophetically foreseen the onset of the Second World War and the annihilation that it would bring with it, but expressed it all in poetic touches so delicate that their true import might have been missed before the event.  Such is her poem entitled "Maj 1939" (May 1939) published on the first page of the Wiadomości Literackie, the premier literary periodical in pre-War Poland, 61 days before the outbreak of the War, in July 1939. The poem is surrounded on all sides by the massive article by Edward Boyé analyzing the nature of the Italian Fascism, the only other piece printed on the page.  Ginczanka's poem, deceptively insouciant  almost ebullient  in tone while it considers the uncertainty as to whether the Spring might pass under the shadow of war or alternatively under the spell of love, employs the metaphor of the fork in the road where either of the two divergent arms, though ostensibly very different and having the opposite direction "at odds" with the other, does in fact lead "to the last things" (do spraw ostatecznych; line 28).  Thus, in a twist on Robert Frost's famous poem, it makes no difference here to take "the one less travelled by":

Invasion of Poland

Ginczanka left Warsaw in June 1939 to spend her summer vacations (as was her habit every year) with her grandmother in Równe Wołyńskie. Here she was caught by the outbreak of the Second World War occasioned by the Invasion of Poland by Nazi Germany on Friday, 1 September 1939, and in reaction to this news decided to stay at Równe, a town which, being located on the Eastern Borderlands of Poland, was relatively sheltered from the hostilities of war. This circumstance changed dramatically just two weeks later with the Soviet Union's attack on Poland from the East on 17 September, which brought Soviet rule to Równe (a town never to be returned to Poland again), and with it communist harassment and attacks targeting the "bourgeois elements" and the propertied classes in particular. The grandmother Klara Sandberg's ground-floor business (pharmacy store) in the town's main street was immediately expropriated, while their second-story living quarters were in large measure requisitioned for Soviet officials, squeezing the owners (including Ginczanka) into a single servant's room. These developments forced upon Ginczanka the decision to leave Równe to try to find accommodation in the much larger Polish city of Lvov, situated 213 kilometres to the south-east and likewise occupied by the Soviet Union. Before departure, the grandmother packed all the family heirlooms and valuables like table silver into her luggage, both as a means of preserving her ownership of the movable property and to provide for Ginczanka's future dowry. In Lvov Ginczanka rented a flat in the apartment building in the ulica Jabłonowskich № 8a (pictured to the right), where her co-residents included Karol Kuryluk, and the writers Władysław Bieńkowski (19061991), Marian Eile (19101984), and Franciszek Gil (19171960).

During the years 19391942 Ginczanka lived in the city of Lvov in occupied Poland, working as an editor. She wrote a number of Soviet propaganda poems. She narrowly managed to avoid arrest by Ukrainian forces targeting Jewish population of the city, being shielded by her Nansen passport which, unfamiliar to them, impressed them sufficiently to spare her.

Early in 1940, at the age of 22, she married in Lvov the Polish art historian Michał Weinzieher, her senior in age by 14 years (in some accounts, by 16 years), a move which she did not elect to explain to her friends. While officially married to Weinzieher, she carried on a contemporaneous relationship with an artist Janusz Woźniakowski, a young Polish graphic designer extremely devoted to her poetry. Woźniakowski helped her avoid detection after Nazi Germany's invasion of Lvov late in June 1941 and offered her general moral support. In the report of the writer Franciszek Gil (19171960) who lived in the same apartment building with Ginczanka, she became for Woźniakowski the sole reason for his existence. During this period Ginczanka was very active literarily, composing many new poems which, while unpublished, were read during small gatherings of friends. Most of the manuscripts with these works have perished, very few of them being recreated after the War from memory by those who had come to know them by heart.

With the invasion by Nazi Germany of the Eastern Borderlands of Poland on 22 June 1941, an area previously occupied since 17 September 1939 by the Soviet Union, the situation of the Jewish population once again changed dramatically for the worse, the Holocaust being already in full swing at that time. In Równe, Ginczanka's grandmother and her closest relative in Poland, Klara Sandberg, was arrested by the Nazis and died of a heart attack induced by the horror of impending death while being transported to a place of execution at Zdołbunów, barely 17 kilometres away.  In Lvov, the female concierge in the building where Ginczanka resided, resentful of having allocated space in her building to a refugee like Ginczanka in the first place, saw her opportunity to rid herself of the unwelcome tenant and at the same time to enrich herself. In the summer of 1942 she denounced Ginczanka to the Nazi authorities newly in power in town as a Jew hiding in her building on false papers. The Nazi police immediately made an attempt to arrest Ginczanka, but other residents of the building helped her avoid arrest by slipping out the back door, etc. On one single day the Schupo made three separate raids on the building in an effort to arrest Ginczanka.  They finally succeeded in capturing her. While a narrow brush with death, this arrest did not result in Ginczanka's execution as on this occasion she escaped from captivity. Sources differ as to the exact circumstances in which this happened. According to the court documents from the post-War trial of Zofja Chomin, as reported in the press (see Aftermath below), she managed to give her captors a slip after having been brought to the police station but before being securely imprisoned; according to other sources, her friends managed to redeem her from Nazi hands by bribery. Whatever the details of this outcome, the incident led Ginczanka to the writing of her best known poem "Non omnis moriar" (see insert).

Kraków period
In September 1942 Michał Weinzieher, Ginczanka's husband, decided to leave Lvov in order to escape the internment in the Lvov Ghetto. They moved to Kraków in the hope that the large city where he was unknown would provide him the anonymity necessary for survival on false papers. His own younger brother had already been murdered two years earlier by the Soviets in the Katyn Massacre, and Weinzieher was literally running away from death. During his stay in Kraków with the Güntner family Weinzieher (unwisely for the times) continued to pursue his left-wing political activism and continued to maintain contacts with underground left-wing political parties. It is here, and in these circumstances, that he was joined a few months later by his wife, Zuzanna Ginczanka, whose false papers indicated that she was a person of Armenian nationality. The few months that separated her and her husband's arrival in Kraków were spent by Ginczanka with Woźniakowski at his aunt's in Felsztyn, 97 kilometres to the south-west of Lvov, where Ginczanka was presented as Woźniakowski's fiancée. The false papers on which Ginczanka and Weinzieher travelled were provided in both cases by Janusz Woźniakowski.

In Kraków Ginczanka occupied a room next door to Weinzieher's, spending most of her time in bed. According to her hosts, Ginczanka used to say that "My creative juices flow from my laziness". Here her most frequent visitor was Janusz Woźniakowski, but she also maintained close contacts with the noted painter, Helena Cygańska-Walicka (19131989), the wife of the art historian Michał Walicki, Anna Rawicz, and others. Because even on rare outings in the street Ginczanka was attracting the unwelcome attention of passers-by with her exotic beauty, she decided to change her hideaway by moving to the (then suburban) spa locality of Swoszowice on the southern outskirts of Kraków, where she joined up with a childhood friend of hers from Równe, Blumka Fradis, who was herself at the time hiding there from the Nazis.

At the beginning of 1944, apparently as an entirely fortuitous mishap, Janusz Woźniakowski was arrested in a mass łapanka or random round-up of Polish citizens in the street. The laundry receipt found on his person indicated the address of Ginczanka's old hideout, no longer occupied by her but a place where Woźniakowski continued to reside with Weinzieher. During a search of the premises, which a bloodied Woźniakowski was made to witness, Ginczanka's husband, Michał Weinzieher, was additionally arrested. On 6 April 1944 there appeared pasted on the walls of Kraków an announcement issued by the "Summary Tribunal of the Security Police" (Standgericht der Sicherheitspolizei) listing 112 names of people sentenced to death: the first 33 names were those on whom the sentence of death had already been carried out, the rest were those awaiting execution. Janusz Woźniakowski's name is the fifth on the list. Michał Weinzieher's is further down.

Arrest
Zuzanna Ginczanka frequently changed hiding places, the last one was in the apartment of Holocaust rescuer Elżbieta Mucharska; located at Mikołajska № 5 Street in the heart of Kraków Old Town. The circumstances of Ginczanka's arrest were pondered upon by postwar memorist. The first account is that of Wincentyna Wodzinowska-Stopkowa (19151991), published in her 1989 memoir Portret artysty z żoną w tle ("A Portrait of the Artist with the Wife in the Background"). Ginczanka's hideout and the passwords used by her rescuers was intercepted by Gestapo from several clandestine messages intended to be smuggled out of prison, and addressed to them. The Stopkas, who were themselves incriminated by the clandestine messages in question, managed to get the Gestapo to leave without arresting them by bribing them with bottles of liquor and  gold coins, "which disappeared into their pockets in a flash". As soon as the Gestapo were safely away Wodzinowska-Stopkowa rushed to Ginczanka's nearby hideout to forewarn her of imminent danger, only to be greeted at the door by a sobbing woman who directly said, "They took her already. She yelled, spat at them..." Wodzinowska-Stopkowa then ran breathlessly to the residences of all the other people named in the "kites" written by Woźniakowski, arriving in each case too late, after the arrests of the individuals concerned.

A separate account of Zuzanna Ginczanka's arrest was given orally to Professor Izolda Kiec of the University of Poznań 46 years after the fact, in January 1991, by Jerzy Tomczak, grandson of Elżbieta Mucharska, Ginczanka's last hostess in Kraków mentioned in the preceding paragraph; it is included in her 1994 book Zuzanna Ginczanka: życie i twórczość ("Zuzanna Ginczanka: Life and Work"; see Bibliography), to date the most serious book on Ginczanka  a poet who is still awaiting a proper critical, academic biography. At the time of Ginczanka's arrest in the autumn of 1944 Tomczak was ten years' old and living in one room with Ginczanka for about a month or so. He recalls that during her stay Ginczanka never left the premises even once for security reasons, and she would never open the door if she happened to be alone. The only visitor she received was a high-school friend of hers, "a blonde without Semitic features" (Blumka Fradis).  Returning from school one day he was intercepted on the stairs by a neighbour who told him to back off: "They are at your place...".  He withdrew at this and went into the entryway of the apartment building across the street (pictured to the right). About half an hour later, from this vantage point, he observed Zuzanna Ginczanka and Blumka Fradis being escorted by the Gestapo out of his building. He comments: "I have no idea how they managed to track them down. I suspect a denunciation by a neighbour. There is no other possibility."

Notes from the prison cell
Izolda Kiec (b. 1965), the author of the 1994 book on Ginczanka, was able to track down a person who was in direct contact with Ginczanka after her last arrest in the autumn of 1944. This person is a woman named Krystyna Garlicka, the sister of the Polish writer Tadeusz Breza (19051970), who resided in 1992 in Paris. Krystyna Garlicka was apparently incarcerated at one point together with Ginczanka, in the same cell, and as a fellow-prisoner developed a rapport with her which made her privy to Ginczanka's confessions and much of her ultimate fate unknown to outsiders.  According to Garlicka's report given to Kiec in 1992, 47 years after the fact, Ginczanka accepted her in prison because she was acquainted with her brother, Tadeusz Breza. They slept together on a single straw mattress that was spread out on the floor for the night, a time when Garlicka would listen to Ginczanka's confessions. According to Garlicka, Ginczanka told her that her final arrest was due to a betrayal by her Kraków hostess, Elżbieta Mucharska, as she herself never left the house and "no one had any knowledge of her whereabouts". Ginczanka, who was at first detained in the notorious facility in the ulica Montelupich, was very afraid of torture (for which that prison was infamous), and to stave off attacks on her body she affected a particular concern for her hair, which she would repeatedly touch during interrogations to make small corrections to her locks, etc. This was noticed by the Gestapo interrogators, and when they came to torment her it was her hair that was selected for special treatment: she was dragged across the floor by the hair. Although she screamed in pain, she was never broken and never admitted to being Jewish. However, this was not the case with her friend (Blumka Fradis), who broke down: "perhaps she lacked the courage and the willpower of Ginczanka", Garlicka comments.  Blumka Fradis made a confession which spelled the end of the investigations and "sealed the fate for both of them". Ginczanka was apparently hoping to be deported in the aftermath to the Kraków-Płaszów concentration camp in the first instance, and thence to Auschwitz, resolved to overcome everything and survive. This however did not happen, as she was transferred to another prison in Kraków.

Place and date of death

There is no consensus among the published sources as to the exact place of Ginczanka's death. There is a broad consensus on the circumstance of her having been executed by firearm, either by single firearm or by firing squad, in a prison located in the southern suburbs of Kraków. Many older sources identify the suburb in question as Płaszów (administratively part of the municipality of Kraków since 1912, but colloquially referred to as a separate community)  not to be confused with the Nazi concentration camp of the same name situated in the same locality: no claim has ever been made that Ginczanka was deported to any concentration camp. Other sources identify the suburb in question to have been the neighbouring spa locality of Swoszowice (likewise today within the southern borders of Kraków municipality).  More recently the prison courtyard of the infamous facility in the ulica Montelupich № 7 in Kraków has been pointed out as the place of her death.  This identification, perhaps conjectural, would contradict the earlier sources, as the prison in question lies in the city centre and not on the southern confines of the metropolitan area.  Finally, and perhaps most authoritatively, Izolda Kiec (see Bibliography), a professor in the University of Poznań, basing her conclusions on unpublished written sources as well as on the numerous oral interviews with eyewitnesses and others directly connected with Ginczanka's life conducted in the 1970s and 1980s, indicates for the first time the courtyard of the prison facility located in the ulica Stefana Czarnieckiego № 3 in Kraków as the place of Ginczanka's martyrdom (see picture to the right).  The latter identification does not contradict the earlier sources citing Płaszów, as both the Płaszów precinct and the ulica Czarnieckiego are located in the same southern Kraków district of Podgórze. Moreover, Kiec also states  thereby possibly reconciling all the earlier sources  that Ginczanka was indeed imprisoned at first in the Montelupich Prison, where her interrogation under torture took place, and only after that had been completed was she transferred to the (smaller) prison in the ulica Czarnieckiego, where she was murdered.  Ginczanka was 27 years old.

Ginczanka's high-school friend, Blumka Fradis, was shot in the courtyard at Czarnieckiego 3 together with her.

Józef Łobodowski reports the privileged information he received in the 1980s from a source he does not reveal to the effect that Ginczanka's execution took place "just before" (tuż przed) the liberation of Kraków (a historical event dated to 18 January 1945)  that is to say, in the first part of January 1945. Without specifying the 1945 date, Izolda Kiec says much the same thing ("a few days (na kilka dni) before the end of the war").  If the expressions "just before" and "a few days" were to be interpreted figuratively to mean "a short time" but not necessarily "a very short time", the date of Ginczanka's death could be pushed back to December 1944, but this procedure would involve stretching the literal meaning of the words of these two key witnesses.  Wacław Iwaniuk, a personal acquaintance of Ginczanka, strongly corroborates our dating of Ginczanka's death: in an interview given in 1991, Iwaniuk states: "Ginczanka was murdered by the Gestapo in Kraków, probably on the last day of Kraków's occupation" (chyba w ostatnim dniu okupacji Krakowa)  i.e., on 17 January 1945.

In an article published in the Gazeta Wyborcza in December 2015, Ryszard Kotarba, the historian of the aforementioned Kraków-Płaszów concentration camp, speculates however that Ginczanka might have been among the several prisoners brought to that camp by truck on 5 May 1944, most of whom were executed on the spot.

"Non omnis moriar"
Her single best known poem, written in 1942 and untitled, commonly referred to as "Non omnis moriar" from its opening words (Latin for "Not all of me will die", the incipit of an ode by Horace), which incorporates the name of her purported betrayer within the text, is a paraphrase of Juliusz Słowacki's poem "Testament mój" (The Testament of Mine).  The "Non omnis moriar" was first published in the weekly periodical Odrodzenie of Kraków in 1946 at the initiative of Julian Przyboś, a poet who had been one of the most distinguished members of the so-called Kraków Avant-garde (Awangarda Krakowska).  Przyboś appended a commentary entitled "Ostatni wiersz Ginczanki" (Ginczanka's Last Poem), saying in part:
Hers is the most moving voice in Polish lyrical literature, for it deals with the most terrible tragedy of our time, the Jewish martyrdom.  Only the poems of Jastrun, serving as they are as an epitaph on the sepulchre of millions, make a similar impression, but not even do they evince the same degree of bitterness, of irony, of virulence and power or convey the same brutal truth as does the testament of Ginczanka.  I find its impact impossible to shake off.  We read it for the first time pencilled on a torn and wrinkled piece of paper, like the secret messages that prisoners smuggle out of their dungeons.  (…) The most despairing confessions, the most heartrending utterances of other poets before their death fall far below this proudest of all poetic testaments.  This indictment of the human beast hurts like an unhealed wound.  A shock therapy in verse.
The "Non omnis moriar" was highly esteemed by many others, including the poet Stanislaw Wygodzki, while another Polish poet, Anna Kamieńska, considered it to be one of the most beautiful poems in the Polish language.  Scholars have uncovered textual parallels between "Non omnis moriar" and the Petit Testament of François Villon.  However, perhaps the most significant aspect of the "Non omnis moriar" is its indictment of Polish antisemitism by a Jewish woman who wished more than anything else to become a Polish poet, and to be accepted as Polish (rather than as an "exotic Other").  In her entire oeuvre Ginczanka never espoused anything like a Jewish identity, her preoccupations with identity having been focused exclusively on her being a woman.  It is the reference made in the "Non omnis moriar" to the "Jewish things" (rzeczy żydowskie; line 6)  Ginczanka's personal effects that will now be looted by her betrayer, the thirty pieces of Jewish silver earned by (and in ethnic contrast with) this particular kiss of an Aryan Judas  that takes Ginczanka out of the sphere of realisation of her dream.

Aftermath
In January 1946 on charges of collaborationism Zuzanna Ginczanka's betrayer before the Nazis, Zofja Chomin, and her son Marjan Chomin were arrested and tried in a court of law. Ginczanka's poem "Non omnis moriar" formed part of the evidence against them.  (This is considered by many scholars to be the only instance in the annals of juridical history of a poem being entered in evidence in a criminal trial.)  According to the article which appeared in the newspaper Express Wieczorny of 5 July 1948 (page 2), Zofja Chomin, the concierge in the building (in the ulica Jabłonowskich № 8a) where Ginczanka lived in Lwów, was sentenced to four years' imprisonment for betraying Ginczanka's identity to the Nazis  the poem "Non omnis moriar" again being cited in the writ of the sentence  while her son was acquitted.  Zofja Chomin's defence before the court were to be her words, intended to refute the charge of collaborationism: "I knew of only one little Jewess in hiding..." (znałam tylko jedną żydóweczkę ukrywającą się...).  An account of these events is given in a study by Agnieszka Haska (see Bibliography).

Remembrance

Despite the quality of her poetry, Ginczanka was ignored and forgotten in postwar Poland, as communist censors deemed her work to be undesirable. Renewed interest and recognition of her work emerged only after the collapse of communism.

She is the subject of a moving poem by Sydor Rey, entitled "Smak słowa i śmierci" (The Taste of the Word and of Death) and published in 1967, which ends: "I will know at the furthermost confines | The taste of your death".  Another poem in her honour is the composition "Zuzanna Ginczanka" by Dorota Chróścielewska (19481996).

In 1987, poet Józef Łobodowski published a collection of poems in memory of Ginczanka entitled Pamięci Sulamity. In 1991, after Poland regained independence, a volume of her collected poems was published. Izolda Kiec published two books devoted to Ginczanka: a biography entitled Zuzanna Ginczanka. Życie i twórczość (Zuzanna Ginczanka. Life and Works) in 1994 and Ginczanka. Nie upilnuje mnie nikt in 2020.

In 2001, Agata Araszkiewicz, published a book Wypowiadam wam moje życie. Melancholia Zuzanny Ginczanki (I Am Expressing to You My Life: The Melancholy of Zuzanna Ginczanka).

In 2003, poet Maciej Woźniak, dedicated a poem to her in his collection of poems Obie strony światła (Both Sides of Light). In 2015, the Museum of Literature in Warsaw hosted an exhibition Tylko szczęście jest prawdziwym życiem (Only Happiness Is Real Life) devoted to the works of Ginczanka.

In 2017, on the centenary of Ginczanka's birth, a commemorative plaque was unveiled on a tenement house on Mikołajska Street in Kraków where she was in hiding during her stay in the city. The same year, Marek Kazmierski translated and published the first book of her work in English. In 2019, Jarosław Mikołajewski published a book Cień w cień. Za cieniem Zuzanny Ginczanki which deals with her life and literary legacy.

In 2021, Hanna Kubiak and Bernhard Hofstötter published the first German edition of works by Ginczanka.

Publications
 O centaurach (1936)
 Wiersze wybrane (1953)
 Zuzanna Ginczanka [: wiersze] (1980)
 "Non omnis moriar" (before 1990)
 Udźwignąć własne szczęście (1991)
 Krzątanina mglistych pozorów: wiersze wybrane = Un viavai di brumose apparenze: poesie scelte (2011; bilingual edition: text in Polish and Italian)
 Von Zentauren und weitere ausgewählte Gedichte (2021; German edition; ISBN 978-3347232334)

Translation
Vladimir Mayakovsky, Wiersze, translated into Polish by Zuzanna Ginczanka (1940)

Antologies
 Sh. L. [Shemuʾel-Leyb] Shnayderman, Between Fear and Hope, tr. N. Guterman, New York, Arco Publishing Co., 1947.  (Includes an English translation of "Non omnis moriar", pp. 262263, perhaps the first publication of the poem, in any language, in book form.  Important also for the background information on the situation of the Jews within the Polish society in the immediate aftermath of the Second World War, shedding light on their situation before and during the War.)
 R. Matuszewski & S. Pollak, Poezja Polski Ludowej: antologia. Warsaw, Czytelnik, 1955.  (Includes the original text of "Non omnis moriar", p. 397.)
 Ryszard Marek Groński, Od Stańczyka do STS-u: satyra polska lat 19441956, Warsaw, Wydawnictwa Artystyczne i Filmowe, 1975.  (Includes the original text of "Non omnis moriar", p. 9.)
 I. Maciejewska, Męczeństwo i zagłada Żydów w zapisach literatury polskiej. Warsaw, Krajowa Agencja Wydawnicza, 1988.  .  (Includes the original text of "Non omnis moriar", p. 147.)
 R. Matuszewski & S. Pollak, Poezja polska 19141939: antologia. Warsaw, Czytelnik, 1962.
 Szczutek. Cyrulik Warszawski. Szpilki: 19191939, comp. & ed. E. Lipiński, introd. W. Filler, Warsaw, Wydawnictwa Artystyczne i Filmowe, 1975.  (Includes Ginczanka's poem "Słówka", p. 145.)
 Poezja polska okresu międzywojennego: antologia, 2 vols., comp. & ed. M. Głowiński & J. Sławiński, Wrocław, Zakład Narodowy im. Ossolińskich, 1987.

See also
Betrayal of Anne Frank
Henryka Łazowertówna
Polish culture during World War II

Footnotes

Citations

References
W 3-cią rocznicę zagłady ghetta w Krakowie (13.III.194313.III.1946), [ed. M. M. Borwicz, N. Rost, J. Wulf], Cracow, Centralny Komitet Żydów Polskich [Central Committee of Polish Jewry], 1946, page 83.
Michał Głowiński, "O liryce i satyrze Zuzanny Ginczanki", Twórczość, No. 8, 1955.
Jan Śpiewak (19081967), "Zuzanna: gawęda tragiczna"; in id., Przyjaźnie i animozje, Warsaw, Państwowy Instytut Wydawniczy, 1965, pages 167219.
Jan Śpiewak, "Zuzanna"; in id., Pracowite zdziwienia: szkice poetyckie, ed. A. Kamieńska, Warsaw, Czytelnik, 1971, pages 2649.
Józef Łobodowski, Pamięci Sulamity, Toronto, Polski Fundusz Wydawniczy w Kanadzie, 1987.  (The introduction critiques, in part, Śpiewak's contribution "Zuzanna: gawęda tragiczna" (see above), pointing out inaccuracies in his text and his lapses of memory.)
Aleksander Hertz, The Jews in Polish Culture, tr. R. Lourie, ed. L. Dobroszycki, foreword by Cz. Miłosz, Evanston (Illinois), Northwestern University Press, 1988, page 128.  .  (1st Polish ed., Paris, 1961.)
Tadeusz Wittlin, Ostatnia cyganeria, Warsaw, Czytelnik, 1989, pages 241248.  .  (1st ed., London, 1974.  Recollections of a personal acquaintance of Ginczanka.)
Natan Gross, Poeci i Szoa: obraz zagłady Żydów w poezji polskiej, Sosnowiec, Offmax, 1993, pages 118ff.  .
Izolda Kiec, Zuzanna Ginczanka: życie i twórczość, Poznań, Obserwator, 1994.  .
Mieczysław Inglot, "Non omnis moriar Zuzanny Ginczanki w kręgu konwencji literackiej"; in: Studia Historyczno-Demograficzne, ed. T. Jurek & K. Matwijowski, Wrocław, Wydawnictwo Uniwersytetu Wrocławskiego, 1996, pages 135146.  (With a summary in German.)
Żydzi w Polsce: antologia literacka, ed. H. Markiewicz, Cracow, Towarzystwo Autorów i Wydawców Prac Naukowych Universitas, 1997, page 416.  .  (Includes the original text of "Non omnis moriar".)
Jadwiga Sawicka, Wołyń poetycki w przestrzeni kresowej, Warsaw, DiG, 1999, passim.  .
Rafael F. Scharf, "Literature in the Ghetto in the Polish Language: Z otchlaniFrom the Abyss"; in: Holocaust Chronicles: Individualizing the Holocaust through Diaries and other Contemporaneous Personal Accounts, ed. R. M. Shapiro, introd. R. R. Wisse, Hoboken (New Jersey), Ktav, 1999, page 39.  .
Agata Araszkiewicz, Wypowiadam wam moje życie: melancholia Zuzanny Ginczanki, Warsaw, Fundacja Ośka, 2001.  .
Bożena Umińska, Postać z cieniem: portrety Żydówek w polskiej literaturze od końca XIX wieku do 1939 roku, Warsaw, Sic!, 2001, pages 353ff.  .
Ryszard Matuszewski (19142010), Alfabet: wybór z pamięci 90-latka, Warsaw, Iskry, 2004, page 125.  . (Recollections of a former personal acquaintance of Ginczanka.)
Elzbieta Adamiak, "Von Schräubchen, Pfeilern und Brücken… Dichterinnen und Theologinnen mittel- und osteuropäischer Kontexte ins Wort gebracht"; in: Building Bridges in a Multifaceted Europe: Religious Origins, Traditions, Contexts and Identities..., ed. S. Bieberstein, K. Buday & U. Rapp, Louvain, Peeters, 2006, pages 924. , .  (Includes a German translation of the poem "Non omnis moriar", p. 19.  Together with "Non omnis moriar", the article considers two other poems, by Kazimiera Iłłakowiczówna and Wisława Szymborska respectively, from the point of view of the Feminist literary theory.)
Sylwia Chutnik, "Kobiety Ziemiańskiej", Polityka, No. 13 (2698), 28 March 2009, p. 63. (See online)
Bożena Shallcross, Rzeczy i zagłada, Cracow, Towarzystwo Autorów i Wydawców Prac Naukowych Universitas, 2010.  , .  (Includes the original text of "Non omnis moriar", p. 32; and an English summary of the entire book, pp. 207208.)
Bożena Shallcross, The Holocaust Object in Polish and Polish-Jewish Culture, Bloomington (Indiana), Indiana University Press, 2011, esp. pages 1350, and passim. , .  (Includes a translation of the poem "Non omnis moriar", pp. 3738, more accurate than the one given above, and a detailed, deconstructive analysis of the work.)

Further reading
 Agata Araszkiewicz Wypowiadam wam moje życie. Melancholia Zuzanny Ginczanki. (2001)
Agnieszka Haska, "'Znałam tylko jedną żydóweczkę ukrywającą się…': sprawa Zofii i Mariana Chominów", Zagłada Żydów: Studia i Materiały, No. 4, 2008, pages 392407.
 Izolda Kiec Zuzanna Ginczanka. Życie i twórczość. (1994)

External links

Photos
A photograph of Zuzanna Ginczanka
Culture.pl, A photograph of Zuzanna Ginczanka. Retrieved from Archive.is
Another photograph of Ginczanka.
The Photography Department (Dział Dokumentacji Fotograficznej) of the Museum of Literature in Warsaw has at least 19 photographs from different periods of Ginczanka's life (some extremely rare pictures from her childhood, and a picture of her father) which can be viewed on the East News stock-photo agency website
Ginczanka with high-school friends at Równe Wołyńskie in 1936; Blumka Fradis, who was murdered with her in 1945, is on the left; Lusia Gelmont, on the right, will be instrumental in bringing Ginczanka's poem "Non omnis moriar" to publication after the War.
A 2010 photograph of the house in the ulica Mikołajska 5 in Cracow, the site of Ginczanka's last hideout where she was arrested in 1944 before being executed Photo by Paweł Krzan (July 2010).

Texts
"Non omnis moriar" in English translation.
Another English translation of "Non omnis moriar".
Italian translation of "Non omnis moriar" by Alessandro Amenta (2011)
An English translation of the poem "Żyzność sierpniowa" (1933)
Zuzanna Ginczanka's Beauty and Brand, Culture.pl

1917 births
1945 deaths
Deaths by firearm in Poland
Jewish poets
People executed by Nazi Germany by firing squad
Poets from Kyiv
People from Rivne
People murdered in Poland
Polish civilians killed in World War II
Polish feminists
Polish Jews who died in the Holocaust
Polish translators
Polish women poets
20th-century women writers
20th-century translators
20th-century Polish poets
Executed Polish women
20th-century Polish women writers